Riccardo Forte (born 17 May 1999) is an Italian footballer who plays as a forward for Serie D club Legnano.

Club career

AC Milan 
Forte made his professional debut for AC Milan in a 2–0 Europa League loss to HNK Rijeka on 7 December 2017.

Loan to Pistoiese 
On 10 August 2018, Forte was loaned out to Serie C side Pistoiese. On 16 September he made his Serie C debut for Pistoiese as a substitute replacing Jacopo Fanucchi in the 85th minute of a 2–1 away defeat against Pro Patria. Two weeks later, on 30 September, he played his first match as a starter for Pistoiese, a 2–2 home draw against Gozzano, he was replaced Alberto Picchi after 64 minutes. On 9 December he played his first entire match for Pistoiese and he scored his first professional goal in the 7th minute of a 2–1 away defeat against Carrarese. On 23 December he scored his second goal in the 70th minute of a 2–0 home win over Arzachena. On 30 March 2019, Forte scored his third goal, as a substitute, in the 79th minute of a 4–0 away win over Juventus U23. Forte ended his loan to Pistoiese with 33 appearances and 3 goals.

Loan to Piacenza and Lecco
On 23 August 2019, Forte was sent out on loan for a second consecutive season in Serie C, this time joining Piacenza on a season-long loan deal. Two days later, on 25 August, he made his debut for the club in Serie C as a 86th-minute substitute replacing Luca Cattaneo in a 0–0 away draw against Arzignano Valchiampo. However his loan was terminated during the 2019–20 season winter break and he returned to Milan leaving Piacenza with only 4 appearances, all as a substitute and in Serie C, remaining an unused substitute for 15 other matches.

On 16 January 2020 he was loaned to Serie C club Lecco on a 6-month loan deal until the end of the season. Three days later, on 19 January, he made his debut for the club as a substitute replacing Simone D'Anna in the 71st minute of a 3–2 home win over Novara, and three days later he ade his second appearances for the club, again as a 74th-minute substitute in a 2–2 home draw against Arezzo. However Forte ended his 6-month loan to Lecco with only these 2 appearances, he also remained an unused substitute in 5 other matches.

Cavese
On 21 September 2020, he moved to Serie C club Cavese on a permanent basis, signing one-year contract with an extension option. Five days later, on 26 September, Forte made his debut for the club as a starter in a 1–0 home defeat against Vibonese, he was replaced by Giuseppe Montaperto after 61 minutes. On 7 October he scored his first goal for Cavese, as a substitute, in the 87th minute of a 3–2 home defeat against Bari.

Mestre
On 22 February 2021, he joined Serie D club Mestre.

Career statistics

Club

References

External links
 
 
 Serie A Profile
 FIGC Profile
 Milan Profile

1999 births
Living people
Footballers from Trieste
Italian footballers
A.C. Milan players
U.S. Pistoiese 1921 players
Piacenza Calcio 1919 players
Calcio Lecco 1912 players
Cavese 1919 players
A.C. Mestre players
Casale F.B.C. players
A.C. Legnano players
Serie C players
Serie D players
Association football forwards